Taşköy is a village in the Nusaybin District of the Mardin Province in Turkey. The village is populated by Assyrians and had a population of 33 in 2021.

References 

Assyrian communities in Turkey
Tur Abdin
Villages in Nusaybin District
Places of the Assyrian genocide